This is a list of songs written by Canadian songwriter Jim Vallance.

Released songs

References 

Songs written by Jim Vallance
Vallance, Jim